Tony Franklin may refer to:

Tony Franklin (Australian footballer) (born 1950), Australian rules footballer
Tony Franklin (baseball) (born 1950), American baseball player and manager
Tony Franklin (American football coach) (born 1957), American football coach
Tony Franklin (musician) (born 1962), British bass player and keyboardist
Tony Franklin (kicker) (born 1956), American football kicker